Sonia Karlsson (born 1946) is a Swedish social democratic politician who has been a member of the Riksdag since 1988.

External links
Sonia Karlsson at the Riksdag website

1946 births
Living people
Members of the Riksdag from the Social Democrats
Women members of the Riksdag
Members of the Riksdag 2002–2006
21st-century Swedish women politicians